The Orchestra of the Americas (OA) is a Latin Grammy Award winning symphony orchestra of musical leaders, ages 18 to 30, representing more than 25 countries of the Western Hemisphere.

Leadership
The orchestra is guided by Artistic Advisor Plácido Domingo and Music Director Carlos Miguel Prieto.

History
The orchestra is an initiative of The Orchestra of the Americas Group. Other initiatives within the group include Global Leaders Institute, Music In Action Journal, SoundPost Podcast, OAcademy, (Re)Setting The Stage conference series, and Lideres Emprendedores entrepreneurship prize.

The orchestra was founded in 2002 by VISIÓN Inc in partnership with the New England Conservatory. The Orchestra's creation was inspired by pioneering work of figures including Jorge Peña Hen (Chile), Ana Milena Muñoz Gómez (Colombia), Oscar Arias (Costa Rica), José Antonio Abreu (Venezuela), and others throughout the Americas, to give the platform of the symphony orchestra renewed purpose at the epicenter of social transformations in diverse, underprivileged communities. The organization was established by founding chairman Hilda Ochoa-Brillembourg, vice-chairman Mark Churchill, vice-chairman José Antonio Abreu, and CEO & Managing Director Debra McKeon, in partnership with The David Rockefeller Center for Latin American Studies  at Harvard University, the Organization of American States, and the Inter-American Development Bank. Early musical supporters include Yo-Yo Ma, Carlos Miguel Prieto, Plácido Domingo, Gustavo Dudamel, and Benjamin Zander, among others. Since its inaugural tour, The Orchestra of the Americas has performed more than 400 concerts for audiences in 35+ countries throughout the Americas, Europe, and Asia. The Orchestra has reached over 15 million people through television & radio broadcasts, recordings, print, and television - including three feature-length documentary films dedicated to the Orchestra. The Orchestra has released a number of critically acclaimed commercial recordings with Plácido Domingo, Gabriela Montero, Philip Glass, and others.

Collaborators
Carlos Miguel Prieto is music director and Plácido Domingo is Founding Artistic Advisor of The Orchestra of the Americas. Gustavo Dudamel was the Orchestra' Co-Principal Conductor from 2003 to 2010. Guest conductors have included Lorin Maazel, Valery Gergiev, Kent Nagano, Leonard Slatkin, Rafael Payare, Helmuth Rilling, Isaac Karabtchevsky, and José Serebrier, among others. Soloists include Yo-Yo Ma, Joshua Bell, Sarah Chang, Vadim Repin, Julian Rachlin, Nelson Freire, Alisa Weilerstein, Louis Lortie, Ingrid Fliter, James Ehnes, Gabriela Montero, Paquito d'Rivera, Antonio Meneses, Matt Haimovitz, Ildar Abdrazakov, Mariachi Vargas, Danilo Perez, Horacio Lavandera, Ilya Gringolts, Philippe Quint, Edmundo T. Ramírez, Alex Klein, among others. The Orchestra's instrumental coaching faculty includes members of the world's top orchestras, among them principals of the Metropolitan Opera Orchestra, San Francisco Symphony, Chicago Symphony, New York Philharmonic, Montreal Symphony, Boston Symphony, Rome Opera, Royal Concertgebouw Orchestra, Brussels Philharmonic, Cleveland Orchestra, Philadelphia Orchestra, Toronto Symphony, Royal Philharmonic, London Symphony Orchestra, Royal Stockholm Philharmonic, as well as academic music institutions of high repute including The Juilliard School, The Curtis Institute of Music, The Colburn School, and Shepherd School of Music. Head of Faculty since 2006 has been Argentine violinist Leon Spierer who led the Berlin Philharmonic as Concertmaster from 1963 to 1993 under Herbert von Karajan. Composers-in-Residence to work with the Orchestra include John Estacio (2009), Philip Glass (2010 & 2011), Juan Orrego-Salas (2012), Tan Dun (2013), Arturo Marquez (2014), Nicolas Gilbert (2015),  Arvo Pärt (2016), Jüri Reinvere (2016), Gabriela Montero (2017), Juan Jose Chuquisengo (2017), Krzysztof Penderecki (2018), Myroslav Skoryk (2018), and Gabriela Ortiz (2019), among others.

Members
Annually up to 6000 musicians across the Western Hemisphere enter the process of auditioning for one of 80 seats in the Orchestra, ranking it among the most competitive orchestra academies in the world. All accepted participants join the Orchestra for a period of one year on full scholarship, which includes an annual international residency and tour. Alumni occupy posts in major international orchestras including the London Symphony Orchestra, Mariinsky Theatre Orchestra, Cleveland Orchestra, Toronto Symphony, Pacific Symphony, National Symphony Orchestra, Metropolitan Opera Orchestra, Los Angeles Philharmonic, OSESP, Orquesta Sinfonica Nacional de Mexico, Charlotte Symphony, Louisiana Philharmonic, Portland Symphony, Boston Philharmonic, Buenos Aires Philharmonic, Boston Symphony, Detroit Symphony, Sarasota Orchestra, Seattle Symphony, New World Symphony, Los Angeles Philharmonic, Rotterdam Philharmonic, Paris Opera, Seoul Philharmonic, Chicago Civic Orchestra, Orchestra London, National Arts Centre Orchestra, Minnesota Orchestra, and others. Many alumni have also founded musical institutions in their home regions that focus on social transformation and community development.

Affiliates

Global Leaders Institute  
The Global Leaders Program (GLP) (now branded Global Leaders Institute) was launched in 2013 as an affiliate of The Orchestra of the Americas Group. Curated by a number of top academic institutions and think-tanks including Harvard University, McGill University, New York University, Georgetown University, Bard College, and Duke University, The Global Leaders Institute offers an annual Executive Graduate Certificate that helps impact-focused musicians succeed as social entrepreneurs. The GLI combines on-site training in diverse international settings with remote classroom learning led by a faculty of pioneers in diverse fields, including Thomas Südhof, winner of the 2013 Nobel Prize in Medicine and Physiology, together with a range of Grammy Winning Artists, TED Presenters, leading academics and cutting-edge practitioners. GLP Cohort Members are prepared simultaneously to act as social entrepreneurs, advocates, pedagogs, performers, managers, civic leaders, and cultural agents.

Other 
Other affiliates launched within The Orchestra of the Americas Group include Music In Action Journal, Lideres Emprendedores, (Re)Setting The Stage conference series, and SoundPost Podcast, among others.

Founded Institutions
The Orchestra has helped to launch several significant music institutions across the Americas including Colombia's National Youth Philharmonic, the National Youth Orchestras of the Dominican Republic, Honduras, Belize, Jamaica, and Haiti, and other initiatives across the Americas modeled on the OA's principles, platform, and training program.

Awards
The Orchestra is the recipient of a Latin Grammy Award (2015) for "Best Classical Album" (Gabriela Montero/Orchestra of the Americas/Carlos Miguel Prieto: Ex-Patria), and the League of American Orchestras "Golden Baton Award" (2012).

Artistic Advisory Council

Martha Argerich
Joshua Bell
Sarah Chang
Thomas Clamor
Paquito D'Rivera
Gustavo Dudamel
James Ehnes
Christoph Eschenbach
Ingrid Fliter
Nelson Freire
Philip Glass
María Guinand
Giancarlo Guerrero
Miguel Harth-Bedoya
Alex Klein
Louis Lortie

Yo-Yo Ma
Branford Marsalis
Arturo Marquez
Roberto Minczuk
Gabriela Montero
Ennio Morricone
Yannick Nézet-Séguin
Cristina Ortiz
Helmuth Rilling
Leonard Slatkin
Leon Spierer
Maximiano Valdes
Emmanuel Villaume
John Williams
Benjamin Zander
David Zinman

Leadership Council

Madeleine K. Albright 
Oswaldo Cisneros
Paulo Coelho
Cecilia Morel Montes
Mario Vargas Llosa

David Rockefeller Jr.
League of American Orchestras
The Americas Society
Organization of American States
Venezuela sin limites

Presidential Council

Colville Young - Belize
Gonzalo Sánchez de Lozada - Bolivia
Fernando Henrique Cardoso - Brazil
Stephen Harper - Canada
Ricardo Lagos - Chile 
Cecilia Morel Montes - Chile
Andrés Pastrana - Colombia
César Gaviria - Colombia
Abel Pacheco de la Espriella - Costa Rica

Óscar Rafael de Jesús Arias Sánchez - Costa Rica 
Lucio Edwin Gutiérrez Borbúa - Ecuador
Alfonso Portillo - Mexico
Vicente Fox - Mexico
Mireya Elisa Moscoso - Panama
Nicanor Duarte Frutos - Paraguay
Luis Ángel González Macchi - Paraguay
George W. Bush - United States
Jorge Batlle - Uruguay

Offices
The Orchestra of the Americas is registered as an organization in the United States, Costa Rica, Canada, Brazil, and Venezuela. The head office is a 501(c)3 located in Washington, DC. The organization's operating budget ranges annually from $2 to $3 million USD.

References

External links
Orchestra of the Americas website
Orchestra of the Americas Facebook
Orchestra of the Americas Instagram
Orchestra of the Americas Twitter
Orchestra of the Americas Canada website
Global Leaders Program website
 Global Leaders Program Facebook
Global Leaders Program Instagram
Global Leaders Program Twitter
Music In Action Journal website

Symphony orchestras
Musical groups established in 2002
National orchestras